The Pudong railway is a railway line in operated by China Railway. Located entirely in Shanghai, China, the  railway line is used solely for freight services, although passenger services did operate along the line until 2015.

Construction of the railway line was completed on 9 December 2005. These trains would use the Jinshan railway between Shanghai South and Jinshan Industrial Park, before switching to the Pudong railway and travelling the entire length of the line.

Passenger service on the line was suspended on 27 August 2015, due to the presence of a hazardous chemicals storage yard near Luchaogang station. This safety measure was taken in response to the 2015 Tianjin explosions.

History 
 It was the first suburban line in Shanghai.
 The investment for the line was 1.951 billion yuan.
 The first phase of Pudong Railway was completed on 9 December 2005.
 Passenger trains 5051-5052 and 5053/5054 officially opened on 1 September 2008.
 The passenger train was renamed K8351/8352, K8353/8354 times on 1 April 2009.
 Passenger trains increased two-way stops at Haiwan Station on 15 September.
 The number of individual passengers per train is roughly 50; about 200 people per day (4 trains) which led to a daily occupancy rate of only 35%.
 Passenger trains suspended on 27 August 2015.

Stations
At the time when it was operating, it took 1 hour and 10 minutes for a train trip between Luchaogang Station and Shanghai South Railway Station, and the fare was 17 yuan.

Service routes

Station name change
 On September 28, 2012, Ruanxiang railway station was renamed Jinshan Yuanqu railway station.

Technology

Rolling stock
There were eight China Railway 25Z passenger cars (body marked 25K) on the bottom of the double-decker passenger train, all of which are soft seats.  The K8351/8352 and K8353/8354 trains use a set of bottoms, using 4 square Bombardier RZ25T plus a KD25G / KD25K generator car.

References 

Rail transport in Shanghai
Railway lines opened in 2005